Renate Mayntz (born 28 April 1929, Berlin) is a German sociologist. She was director of the Max Planck Institute for the Study of Societies, and is now director emerita.

Biography
Mayntz studied in the United States, and in 1957 received her doctorate from the Free University of Berlin. She taught at the Deutsche Hochschule für Verwaltungswissenschaften Speyer and the University of Cologne before founding, in 1984, the Max Planck Institute for the Study of Societies. In 1999, she won the Schader Award, Germany's highest accolade for a social scientist, and in 2004 she was awarded the Bielefelder Wissenschaftspreis.

Her areas of research include social theory, management policy, development and application of policies, the development of technology, science and the development of science and policy, and transnationals and the structures of transnational governance.

References

External links
Renate Mayntz page at Max Planck Institute

1929 births
Living people
Fellows of the American Academy of Arts and Sciences
Columbia University faculty
Max Planck Institute directors
Free University of Berlin alumni